Church of St Mark is a Church of England parish church in the Sheffield suburb of Broomhill, in the United Kingdom.

History 
The church was originally built in 1868–1871 to a standard neo-Gothic design by William Henry Crossland. This building was destroyed by an incendiary bomb during the "Sheffield Blitz" of 12 December 1940; only the spire and a porch survived (they are now Grade II listed structures). The remnants of the bombed church were used as the basis for a new church designed by George Pace and constructed 1958–1963. This new building is of a Modernist design but is also sympathetic to the Gothic spire and porch. It is a rubble-faced concrete building with striking slit windows of varying numbers and locations around the building. There are also two notable stained glass windows: the Te Deum window by Harry Stammers and the west window by John Piper and Patrick Reyntiens.

The parish of Broomhill & Broomhall has increased in area and population size over the years. In the 1970s, the parish boundaries expanded to include the university area and the neighbouring St George's Church was closed. Later, in 2000, another neighbouring church, St Silas, Broomhall, was also closed. The present parish, has come to include a large geographical area which extends from Ranmoor to the city ring road.

Present day
The Vicar is Sue Hammersley, the Associate Vicar Sarah Colver and the Assistant Priest Shan Rush. Noted for its radical, inclusive theology, the church includes the organisation 'CRC' (Constructive Responsive Christianity).

See also
List of works by George Pace

References

Harman, R. & Minnis, J. (2004) Pevsner City Guides: Sheffield. pp249–250. New Haven & London: Yale University Press. 
Pace, P. (1990) The Architecture of George Pace. B.T.Batsford Ltd.

External links
St Mark's Church Website Sheffield
St Marks Church on A Church Near You
St Mark's Centre for Radical Christianity
https://www.broomhillsheffield.co.uk/about.html

Grade II listed churches in South Yorkshire
Grade II listed buildings in Sheffield
Churches completed in 1871
19th-century Church of England church buildings
Sheffield
Churches completed in 1963
Churches in Sheffield
Church of England church buildings in South Yorkshire